American IV: The Man Comes Around is the sixty-seventh studio album by Johnny Cash. It was released on November 5, 2002, by American Recordings and Universal Records. It is the fourth in Cash's "American" series of albums, and the last album released during his lifetime, and is considered some of his finest work towards the end of his life. The album was also included in the book 1001 Albums You Must Hear Before You Die.

Background
The majority of songs are covers which Cash performs in his own sparse style, with help from producer Rick Rubin. For instance, for the song "Personal Jesus", Rubin asked Red Hot Chili Peppers guitarist John Frusciante to re-work an acoustic version of Martin Gore's song, which featured a simple acoustic riff that stripped down the song to a blues style. He receives backing vocal assistance from various artists, including Fiona Apple, Nick Cave, and Don Henley.

American IV was the final album Johnny Cash released during his lifetime, though the Unearthed box set was compiled prior to his death, with Cash choosing the tracks and writing liner notes. American IV: The Man Comes Around was Cash's first non-compilation album to go gold in thirty years. Additionally, the album won "Album of the Year" award at the 2003 CMA Awards. It was certified gold on March 24, 2003 and platinum on November 21, 2003 by the Recording Industry Association of America, the first non-compilation album of Cash's to do so since the early 1970s.

The video for "Hurt," a song written by Trent Reznor of Nine Inch Nails and originally released in 1994, was nominated in seven categories at the 2003 MTV Video Music Awards and won the award for Best Cinematography. In 2003, mere days before his 71st birthday, Cash won a Grammy for "Give My Love to Rose", a song Cash had originally recorded in the late 1950s. Cash was also nominated that year for Best Country Collaboration with Vocals for his "Bridge over Troubled Water" cover with Fiona Apple. The music video for "Hurt" also won the award for Best Short Form Video in 2004.

Nine Inch Nails frontman Trent Reznor admitted that he was initially "flattered" but worried that "the idea of Cash covering 'Hurt' sounded a bit gimmicky," but when he heard the song and saw the video for the first time, Reznor said he was deeply moved and found Cash's cover beautiful and meaningful, going as far as to say "that song isn't mine anymore."

Graeme Thomson, in The Resurrection of Johnny Cash: Hurt, Redemption, and American Recordings, has discussed concern about Cash's health during the recording. Cash was suffering from multiple health problems and had lost most of his vision, with recording sessions interrupted by hospital stays. Thomson quotes singer Will Oldham: "We should turn and switch off the tape when our listening energy would be better spent helping a living songwriter/performer."

Previous recordings
Six songs featured on the album had previously been recorded by Cash.
"Give My Love to Rose" was previously recorded by Cash for his 1960 album Sings Hank Williams.
"Sam Hall" was previously recorded by Cash for his 1965 album Johnny Cash Sings the Ballads of the True West.
"Danny Boy" was previously recorded by Cash for his 1965 album Orange Blossom Special.
"I'm So Lonesome I Could Cry" was previously recorded by Cash for his 1960 album Now, There Was a Song!
"Tear Stained Letter" was previously recorded by Cash for his 1972 album A Thing Called Love.
"Streets of Laredo" was previously recorded by Cash for his 1965 album Johnny Cash Sings the Ballads of the True West.

Track listing
Original double LP record release

The original double LP release features a different track order than the 2014 LP release as well as two additional songs: "Wichita Lineman", which was released on the compilation album Lost Highway: Lost & Found Volume 1, and "Big Iron", which was later released on Unearthed. The version of "Wichita Lineman" differs from the version that appears on the Unearthed collection.

Personnel
 Johnny Cash – vocals, acoustic guitar, electric guitar, arranger, adaptation
 Don Henley – drums, keyboards, vocals
 Fiona Apple – vocals
 Nick Cave – vocals (12)
 Mike Campbell, John Frusciante, Randy Scruggs – acoustic guitar, electric guitar
 Thom Bresh, Jeff Hanna, Kerry Marx, Marty Stuart – acoustic guitar
 Smokey Hormel – acoustic guitar, slide guitar, electric guitar
 Jack Clement – Dobro
 Joey Waronker – drums
 David R. Ferguson – ukulele (9), engineer, mixing
 Laura Cash – fiddle, production assistant
 Terry Harrington – clarinet
 Benmont Tench – organ, piano, harmonium, keyboards, Mellotron, vibraphone, pipe organ, Wurlitzer electric piano
 Roger Manning – piano, tack piano, harmonium, Mellotron, Chamberlin, orchestra bells
 Billy Preston – piano, keyboards (7, 13)
 Rick Rubin – producer
 John Carter Cash – producer, engineer
 Thom Russo, Andrew Scheps, Chuck Turner – engineers
 Vladimir Meller – mastering
 Christine Cano – art direction, design
 Martyn Atkins – photography
 Lindsay Chase – production coordination
 Dwight Hume, Jimmy Tittle – production assistants

Charts
Album - Billboard (United States)

Weekly charts

Year-end charts

Certifications

References

2002 albums
Albums produced by Rick Rubin
American Recordings (record label) albums
Gothic country albums
Johnny Cash albums
Lost Highway Records albums
Sequel albums
Covers albums